Easy Money is a 1983 American comedy film starring Rodney Dangerfield, Joe Pesci, Geraldine Fitzgerald, Candice Azzara, and Jennifer Jason Leigh. It was directed by James Signorelli and written by Dangerfield, Michael Endler, P. J. O'Rourke and Dennis Blair. The original music score was composed by Laurence Rosenthal.  Billy Joel performed the theme song "Easy Money" from his album An Innocent Man.

Plot
Montgomery "Monty" Capuletti is a hard-living, heavy-drinking, pot-smoking, gambling family man who makes his living as a baby photographer in New Dorp, Staten Island. He loves his wife Rose but has a very tense relationship with his wealthy, snobbish mother-in-law, Mrs. Monahan, who runs a successful department store chain and hates the way Monty acts and lives.  There is an added ethnic rivalry between Monty and his wife's family, as he is Italian and they are Irish.

The irresponsible Monty cannot even pick up a wedding cake for his engaged daughter Allison without fouling up. He and his best friend Nicholas "Nicky" Cerone are smoking marijuana while driving, and an accident destroys the cake. Allison's wedding to Julio goes off without a hitch, at least until the wedding night.

After Mrs. Monahan dies unexpectedly, his family is in for an inheritance. Attorney Scrappleton reveals that Mrs. Monahan left a stipulation in her will that if Monty is able to curb his vices for a year by going on a diet and giving up drugs and gambling, he will receive $10 million. If not, the family gets nothing. Monty's gambling and drinking buddies are also interested in whether or not Monty can really give up everything and bet whether or not he will make it.

Monty and Nicky go to the mother-in-law's department store and find awkward fashions, catering to a clientele which clearly does not include the likes of Nicky and Monty. Nicky argues that it may not be worth it to Monty if this is the kind of atmosphere he will be exposed to, but Monty points out he must tough it out to provide for his wife and daughters, not just him. Meanwhile, Mrs. Monahan's scheming nephew Clive Barlow does his best to undermine Monty's resolve so the money and department store can instead be left to him.

Monty ultimately reforms. When the entire year is up, he and the family celebrate aboard a boat. To his chagrin though, Mrs. Monahan turns up. She had faked her own death simply to persuade her slovenly son-in-law to straighten up. Ultimately though, she gives the money to Monty on the basis he upheld her stipulation. Now rich, Monty and his family live in a mansion. Still in control, Mrs. Monahan denies Monty dessert and coffee then commands a beer she found in the refrigerator be thrown out. Monty gleefully agrees to each action then says he is heading out for a walk. Mrs. Monahan gloats about her actions and that she finally has Monty under control to her daughter's chagrin. However, Monty has actually proceeded to a hideaway under the house to join Nicky and his friends for pizza, poker, and beer.

Cast
 Rodney Dangerfield as Montgomery "Monty" Capuletti
 Joe Pesci as Nicky Cerone
 Geraldine Fitzgerald as Mrs. Kathleen Monahan
 Candy Azzara as Rose Monahan Capuletti
 Jennifer Jason Leigh as Allison Capuletti Ocampo
 Jeffrey Jones as Clive Barlow
 Taylor Negron as Julio Ocampo
 Tom Noonan as Paddy
 Val Avery as Louie, The Bartender
 Tom Ewell as Daniel Scrappleton
 Lili Haydn as Belinda Capuletti
 Kimberly McArthur as Ginger Jones
 Jeffrey Altman as Bill Jones
 Arch Johnson as Armory Vendor
 Mary Pat Gleason as Party Mother

Release

Box office
Easy Money opened theatrically on August 19, 1983 and earned $5,844,974 in its opening weekend, ranking number one at the domestic box office, toppling the prior three-week #1 run of National Lampoon's Vacation. By the end of its run, the film grossed $29,309,766.

Critical reception
On Rotten Tomatoes, the film holds a 64% approval rating based on 11 reviews.  Writing in the Chicago Tribune, critic Gene Siskel gave the film three stars out of four. He wrote that "the big discovery in the comedy 'Easy Money' is that Rodney Dangerfield, unlike most stand-up comics, does not need dialogue to be funny. He is funny just standing still—or his version of standing still, which includes nervous twitching, profuse sweating, pained expressions and rolling of the eyes." Siskel also called Easy Money "a film that's easy to like" and also praised Pesci's performance, calling him "the unsung hero of 'Easy Money,' an actor whose very appearance gives this little film a lot of class."

Roger Ebert of the Chicago Sun-Times gave the film a mixed rating, 2.5 stars out of 4. While Dangerfield had many funny scenes, Ebert felt the film was poorly-edited and suffered by blunting the "cynical and hard-edged" elements of Dangerfield's stage persona in an attempt to make him more likable.

See also
 List of American films of 1983

References

External links
 
 

1983 films
1983 comedy films
American comedy films
Orion Pictures films
Films shot in New Jersey
Films shot in New York City
Films directed by James Signorelli
Films with screenplays by Rodney Dangerfield
Films scored by Laurence Rosenthal
1983 directorial debut films
1980s English-language films
1980s American films